Wilm Weppelmann (born 17 April 1957 in Lüdinghausen) is a German artist, conceptual artist, garden artist, photographer and writer based in Münster Germany, with extensive solo exhibitions (Town Museum Münster, Museum for Sepulchral Culture Kassel, etc.) concerning the boundaries of human existence. Since 2005, Weppelmann has focused primarily on the meaning of garden culture and its role in the development of human existence.

Work and projects 
Weppelmann's artist projects are interdisciplinary, as he brings a wide variety of disciplines together. Conceptual art, performance art, video art, photographic art, garden art and installation are often included in an overall staging and complemented by an independently curated cultural program. Subversion as an artistic strategy often emphasizes the critical and political statement of his work.

Since 2005, at all levels of his artistic work, the urban garden and urban green takes a pre-eminent position, these include: staged photography, interventions in public space, guerilla gardening, continuous art performances, soil and plant art installations, floating vegetable gardens and other garden creations that deal with historical themes. Central points of reference are the allotment garden, the vegetable culture and, accordingly, the self-sufficiency economy.

Partial bibliography
 Aus dem Woerterbuch der Sterblichkeiten (1996)
 Ich verlaesst ich (2003) 
 Die Kunst in sich zu wohnen (2004) 
 Sterben kommt (2004)

References

External links
The website of the artist Wilm Weppelmann
Freie Gartenakademie | hier wächst Kultur 

1957 births
Artists from North Rhine-Westphalia
Photographers from North Rhine-Westphalia
People from Lüdinghausen
Living people